The 2021 Baylor Bears baseball team represents Baylor University during the 2021 NCAA Division I baseball season. The Bears play their home games at Baylor Ballpark as a member of the Big 12 Conference. They are led by head coach Steve Rodriguez, in his 6th season at Baylor.

Previous season
The 2020 Baylor Bears baseball team notched a 10–6 record in February and early March; however, the remainder of the season was abruptly halted on March 13, 2020, when the Big 12 Conference canceled the remainder of the athletics season due to the Coronavirus pandemic.

Personnel

Coaching Staff

Roster

Schedule and results

! style="" | Regular Season (13–7)
|- valign="top"

|- bgcolor="#bbffbb"
| February 21 || 11:00 am ||  || at * ||  || UTRGV Baseball StadiumEdinburg, TX || W12–7 || Oliver(1–0) || Stevens(0–1) || Ashkinos(1) || 119 || 1–0 || — || StatsStory
|- bgcolor="#ffbbbb"
| February 21 || 2:00 pm ||  || at UTRGV* ||  || UTRGV Baseball StadiumEdinburg, TX || L8–9 || Serbantez(1–0) || Freeman(0–1) || — || 119 || 1–1 || — || StatsStory
|- bgcolor="#ffbbbb"
| February 22 || 1:00 pm ||  || at UTRGV* ||  || UTRGV Baseball StadiumEdinburg, TX || L4–7 || Davis(1–0) || Winston(0–1) || Bridges(1) ||  || 1–2 || — || StatsStory
|- bgcolor="#ffbbbb"
| February 26 || 6:00 pm || FloSports || vs. * ||  || Dell DiamondRound Rock, TX || L4–12 || Saenz(1–1) || Helton(0–1) || — ||  || 1–3 || — || StatsStory
|- bgcolor="#bbffbb"
| February 27 || 12:00 pm || FloSports || vs. #21 * ||  || Dell DiamondRound Rock, TX || W12–6 || Thomas(1–0) || Fitts(0–1) || — ||  || 2–3 || — || StatsStory
|- bgcolor="#ffbbbb"
| February 28 || 5:00 pm || FloSports || vs. * ||  || Dell DiamondRound Rock, TX || L3–9 || Bennett(1–0) || Caley(0–1) || — ||  || 2–4 || — || StatsStory
|-

|- bgcolor="#bbffbb"
| March 2 || 6:30 pm || ESPN+ || Sam Houston State* ||  || Baylor BallparkWaco, TX || W4–0 || Oliver(2–0) || Rudis(0–1) || — || 1,036 || 3–4 || — || StatsStory
|- bgcolor="#bbffbb"
| March 5 || 6:30 pm || ESPN+ || * ||  || Baylor BallparkWaco, TX || W5–4 || Helton(1–0) || Wimberley(0–1) || Boyd(1) || 1,250 || 4–4 || — || StatsStory
|- bgcolor="#bbffbb"
| March 6 || 2:00 pm || ESPN+ || Memphis* ||  || Baylor BallparkWaco, TX || W9–0(7) || Thomas(2–0) || Durham(0–1) || — || 1,250 || 5–4 || — || StatsStory
|- bgcolor="#bbffbb"
| March 6 || 5:00 pm || ESPN+ || Memphis* ||  || Baylor BallparkWaco, TX || W20–4 || Winston(1–1) || Cothren(0–1) || — || 1,250 || 6–4 || — || StatsStory
|- bgcolor="#bbffbb"
| March 7 || 1:00 pm || ESPN+ || Memphis* ||  || Baylor BallparkWaco, TX || W8–7 || Ashkinos(1–0) || Kelly(1–1) || Boyd(2) || 1,179 || 7–4 || — || StatsStory
|- bgcolor="#bbffbb"
| March 12 || 6:30 pm || ESPN+ || * ||  || Baylor BallparkWaco, TX || W7–3 || Freeman(1–1) || Chatham(0–1) || — || 1,051 || 8–4 || — || StatsStory
|- bgcolor="#bbffbb"
| March 13 || 3:00 pm || ESPN+ || Xavier* ||  || Baylor BallparkWaco, TX || W11–4 || Winston(2–1) || Kelly(0–1) || — || 1,240 || 9–4 || — || StatsStory
|- bgcolor="#bbffbb"
| March 14 || 1:00 pm || ESPN+ || Xavier* ||  || Baylor BallparkWaco, TX || W10–0 || Kettler(1–0) || Bosacker(1–1) || — || 1,073 || 10–4 || — || StatsStory
|- bgcolor="#bbffbb"
| March 16 || 6:30 pm || ESPN+ || UTSA* ||  || Baylor BallparkWaco, TX || W10–8 || Ashkinos(2–0) || Miller(0–1) || Boyd(3) || 1,193 || 11–4 || — || StatsStory
|- bgcolor="#bbffbb"
| March 17 || 6:30 pm || ESPN+ || * ||  || Baylor BallparkWaco, TX || W12–2(7) || Childers(1–0) || Maldonado(0–2) || — || 1,167 || 12–4 || — || StatsStory
|- bgcolor="#ffbbbb"
| March 19 || 6:30 pm || ESPN+ || #10 Texas ||  || Baylor BallparkWaco, TX || L3–5 || Madden(3–1) || Thomas(2–1) || Nixon(1) || 2,168 || 12–5 || 0–1 || StatsStory
|- bgcolor="#ffbbbb"
| March 20 || 3:00 pm || ESPN+ || #10 Texas ||  || Baylor BallparkWaco, TX || L3–4 || Stevens(2–1) || Winston(2–2) || Nixon(2) || 2,336 || 12–6 || 0–2 || StatsStory
|- bgcolor="#bbffbb"
| March 21 || 1:00 pm || ESPN+ || #10 Texas ||  || Baylor BallparkWaco, TX || W11–2 || Kettler(2–0) || Kubichek(2–2) || — || 1,753 || 13–6 || 1–2 || StatsStory
|- bgcolor="#ffbbbb"
| March 23 || 6:30 pm ||  || at UT Arlington* ||  || Clay Gould BallparkArlington, TX || L3–4(11) || Austin(1–0) || Boyd(0–1) || — || 314 || 13–7 || — || StatsStory
|- align="center" bgcolor=""
| March 26 || 6:30 pm || ESPN+ || at #13 TCU ||  || Lupton StadiumFort Worth, TX ||  ||  ||  ||  ||  ||  ||  || 
|- align="center" bgcolor=""
| March 27 || 2:00 pm || ESPN+ || at #13 TCU ||  || Lupton StadiumFort Worth, TX ||  ||  ||  ||  ||  ||  ||  || 
|- align="center" bgcolor=""
| March 28 || 1:00 pm || ESPN+ || at #13 TCU ||  || Lupton StadiumFort Worth, TX ||  ||  ||  ||  ||  ||  ||  || 
|- align="center" bgcolor=""
| March 30 || 6:30 pm || ESPN+ || Texas State* ||  || Baylor BallparkWaco, TX ||  ||  ||  ||  ||  ||  || — || 
|-

|- align="center" bgcolor=""
| April 1 || 6:30 pm || ESPN+ || * ||  || Baylor BallparkWaco, TX ||  ||  ||  ||  ||  ||  || — || 
|- align="center" bgcolor=""
| April 2 || 2:00 pm || ESPN+ || North Carolina A&T* ||  || Baylor BallparkWaco, TX ||  ||  ||  ||  ||  ||  || — || 
|- align="center" bgcolor=""
| April 2 || 6:00 pm || ESPN+ || North Carolina A&T* ||  || Baylor BallparkWaco, TX ||  ||  ||  ||  ||  ||  || — || 
|- align="center" bgcolor=""
| April 3 || 1:00 pm || ESPN+ || North Carolina A&T* ||  || Baylor BallparkWaco, TX ||  ||  ||  ||  ||  ||  || — || 
|- align="center" bgcolor=""
| April 6 || 6:30 pm || ESPN+ || Texas State* ||  || Baylor BallparkWaco, TX ||  ||  ||  ||  ||  ||  || — || 
|- align="center" bgcolor=""
| April 9 || 7:30 pm || ESPNU ||  ||  || Baylor BallparkWaco, TX ||  ||  ||  ||  ||  ||  ||  || 
|- align="center" bgcolor=""
| April 10 || 3:00 pm || ESPN+ || West Virginia ||  || Baylor BallparkWaco, TX ||  ||  ||  ||  ||  ||  ||  || 
|- align="center" bgcolor=""
| April 11 || 12:00 pm || ESPN+ || West Virginia ||  || Baylor BallparkWaco, TX ||  ||  ||  ||  ||  ||  ||  || 
|- align="center" bgcolor=""
| April 16 || 6:00 pm ||  || at  ||  || Hoglund BallparkLawrence, KS ||  ||  ||  ||  ||  ||  ||  || 
|- align="center" bgcolor=""
| April 17 || 2:00 pm ||  || at Kansas ||  || Hoglund BallparkLawrence, KS ||  ||  ||  ||  ||  ||  ||  || 
|- align="center" bgcolor=""
| April 18 || 1:00 pm ||  || at Kansas ||  || Hoglund BallparkLawrence, KS ||  ||  ||  ||  ||  ||  ||  || 
|- align="center" bgcolor=""
| April 23 || 6:30 pm || ESPN+ || at Texas Tech ||  || Dan Law FieldLubbock, TX ||  ||  ||  ||  ||  ||  ||  || 
|- align="center" bgcolor=""
| April 24 || 2:00 pm || ESPN+ || at Texas Tech ||  || Dan Law FieldLubbock, TX ||  ||  ||  ||  ||  ||  ||  || 
|- align="center" bgcolor=""
| April 25 || 2:00 pm || ESPN+ || at Texas Tech ||  || Dan Law FieldLubbock, TX ||  ||  ||  ||  ||  ||  ||  || 
|- align="center" bgcolor=""
| April 27 || 6:30 pm || ESPN+ || Prairie View A&M* ||  || Baylor BallparkWaco, TX ||  ||  ||  ||  ||  ||  || — || 
|-

|- align="center" bgcolor=""
| May 7 || 6:30 pm || ESPN+ || Kansas State ||  || Baylor BallparkWaco, TX ||  ||  ||  ||  ||  ||  ||  || 
|- align="center" bgcolor=""
| May 8 || 3:00 pm || ESPN+ || Kansas State ||  || Baylor BallparkWaco, TX ||  ||  ||  ||  ||  ||  ||  || 
|- align="center" bgcolor=""
| May 9 || 1:00 pm || ESPN+ || Kansas State ||  || Baylor BallparkWaco, TX ||  ||  ||  ||  ||  ||  ||  || 
|- align="center" bgcolor=""
| May 11 || 6:30 pm || ESPN+ || Incarnate Word* ||  || Baylor BallparkWaco, TX ||  ||  ||  ||  ||  ||  || — || 
|- align="center" bgcolor=""
| May 14 || 6:00 pm || ESPN+ || at Oklahoma State ||  || O'Brate StadiumStillwater, OK ||  ||  ||  ||  ||  ||  ||  || 
|- align="center" bgcolor=""
| May 15 || 1:00 pm || ESPN+ || at Oklahoma State ||  || O'Brate StadiumStillwater, OK ||  ||  ||  ||  ||  ||  ||  || 
|- align="center" bgcolor=""
| May 16 || 1:00 pm || ESPN+ || at Oklahoma State ||  || O'Brate StadiumStillwater, OK ||  ||  ||  ||  ||  ||  ||  || 
|- align="center" bgcolor=""
| May 20 || 6:30 pm || ESPN+ ||  ||  || Baylor BallparkWaco, TX ||  ||  ||  ||  ||  ||  ||  || 
|- align="center" bgcolor=""
| May 21 || 6:30 pm || ESPN+ || Oklahoma ||  || Baylor BallparkWaco, TX ||  ||  ||  ||  ||  ||  ||  || 
|- align="center" bgcolor=""
| May 22 || 3:00 pm || ESPN+ || Oklahoma ||  || Baylor BallparkWaco, TX ||  ||  ||  ||  ||  ||  ||  || 
|-

|-
| style="font-size:88%" | Legend:       = Win       = Loss       = Canceled      Bold = Baylor team member
|-
| style="font-size:88%" |"*" indicates a non-conference game."#" represents ranking. All rankings from D1Baseball on the date of the contest."()" represents postseason seeding in the Big 12 Tournament or NCAA Regional, respectively.

Rankings

2021 MLB Draft

References

Baylor Bears
Baylor Bears baseball seasons
Baylor Bears baseball